Adam Henry (born 2 September 1991) is a New Zealand professional rugby league footballer who plays for Racing Club Albi in the Elite One Championship. He primarily plays on the wing, but can also play at centre and five-eighth. He has previously played for the Sydney Roosters and the Bradford Bulls.

Early years
He attended Mount Albert Grammar School, which has produced several notable sporting personalities, including former Sydney Roosters teammate Sonny Bill Williams. He played in the New Zealand Warriors Unders 20's premiership winning team in 2011, scoring 21 tries in his maiden season and also represented the Junior Kiwis.

Sydney Roosters
After moving to the Sydney Roosters, he made his NRL début in round 14 2012, playing on the wing in a losing effort to the Brisbane Broncos.

Bradford Bulls
Henry signed with Super League side Bradford Bulls as a replacement for Keith Lulia.

2014
Henry featured in the pre-season friendlies against Hull FC, Dewsbury Rams and Castleford Tigers. He scored against Hull F.C. (1 try).

He featured in Round 1 (Castleford Tigers) to Round 14 (Catalans Dragons) then in Round 16 (Salford Red Devils) and Round 19 (Catalans Dragons) to Round 20 (St Helens R.F.C.). Adam played in Round 22 (Wigan Warriors) to Round 27 (London Broncos). Henry featured in Round 4 (Oldham R.L.F.C.) to the Quarter Final (Warrington Wolves) in the Challenge Cup. He scored against Hull F.C. (1 try), Huddersfield Giants (2 tries), Oldham R.L.F.C. (1 try), Salford Red Devils (1 try) and Catalans Dragons (1 try).

Adam re-signed for the Bulls for another year despite their relegation to the RFL Championship.

2015
Henry featured in the pre-season friendly against Leeds Rhinos.

He featured in Round 4 (Hunslet Hawks) to Round 13 (Featherstone Rovers) then in Round 21 (Sheffield Eagles) to Round 23 (Halifax). Henry played in Qualifier 1 (Sheffield Eagles) then in Qualifier 7 (Halifax). He also featured in the Challenge Cup in Round 4 (Workington Town) to Round 5 (Hull Kingston Rovers). He scored against Workington Town (5 tries), Halifax (2 tries), Doncaster (2 tries), Sheffield Eagles (2 tries), London Broncos (1 try), Dewsbury Rams (1 try) and Batley Bulldogs (2 tries).

At the end of the season Henry left Bradford to return home.

2016 
Adam Henry signed for Racing Club Albi XIII in the French Elite One Championship in August 2016.

References

External links
Profile at Rugby League Project

1991 births
Living people
Bradford Bulls players
New Zealand rugby league players
New Zealand Māori rugby league players
Sydney Roosters players
Newtown Jets NSW Cup players
Junior Kiwis players
Racing Club Albi XIII players
Rugby league wingers
Rugby league centres
Rugby league fullbacks
Rugby league players from Auckland